Brian Woods (born 9 November 1966) is a former English professional darts player. He used the nickname Pecker for his matches.

Career
Woods has competed on the BDO/WDF circuit for several years. He won the National Singles title 2003 and the Isle of Man Open title in 2005. He has also reached the semi-finals of the English Open in 2003, the Welsh Masters in 2007 and the British Open in 2007. He has also made it to the quarter-finals of the Scottish Open in 2005 and the televised Winmau World Masters in 2005 and 2006. 

He made his World Championship debut in 2006, but was drawn against #1 seed Mervyn King and lost 0–3. The following year, he also went out in the first round to Niels de Ruiter 0–3. Woods then produced his best run of his career so far at the 2008 World Championship beating Paul Hanvidge, Co Stompé and Scott Waites, the number three seed, before losing 3–6 to Simon Whitlock in the semi-finals.

He has continued his good form from Lakeside in 2008 by gain ranking points in most of the events he has entered and won the Pontins May Day Festival Singles Title, the mixed Doubles Title, with doubles partner and English International Trisha Wright, IDPA White Rose Classic, The Peterhead Open and the Elgin Open. In the 2009 BDO World Championship Woods was beaten in first round by the eventual World Champion, Ted Hankey, having claimed Hankey "would be lucky to get nil!".  

Woods returned to Lakeside for the 2010 BDO World Championship, having won one of four qualifying places in the Inter-Playoffs in Bridlington. He unexpectedly won his first round match against Joey ten Berge, before being defeated by Robert Wagner in the sudden death leg, in a match considered by some to be one of the best in recent memory.

At the 2011 BDO World Darts Championship, Woods, the number 11 seed, was beaten 3–0 in the first round to Stephen Bunting. He has also twice competed in the Grand Slam of Darts.

Woods also took part in the UK Open in Bolton, 2011 and went out in the first round, losing 4-1 to Mark Hylton.

World Championship results

BDO

 2006: First round (lost to Mervyn King 0–3)
 2007: First round (lost to Niels de Ruiter 0–3)
 2008: Semi-final (lost to Simon Whitlock 3–6)
 2009: First round (lost to Ted Hankey 0–3)
 2010: Second round (lost to Robert Wagner 3-4)
 2011: First round (lost to Stephen Bunting 0–3)

Performance timeline

External links
Official Website
Woods darts database
Profile Lakeside World Darts Championship brochure 2006

English darts players
1966 births
Living people
British Darts Organisation players
Professional Darts Corporation former tour card holders